The sexual revolution in the 1960s United States was a social and cultural movement that resulted in liberalized attitudes toward sex and morality. In the 1960s, social norms were changing as sex became more widely discussed in society. Erotic media, such as films, magazines, and books, became more popular and gained widespread attention across the country. These changes reveal that sex was entering the public domain, and sex rates, especially among young people, could no longer be ignored.

With the introduction of the pill and second-wave feminism, women gained more control over their bodies and sexuality during the 1960s. Women could engage in sex without the risk of pregnancy.  At the same time, many women involved in the feminist movement questioned the traditional gender and sex roles ascribed to them. Women's liberation movements sought to free women from social and moral confines.

Developments in the gay rights movement occurred during the same period, such as public demonstrations and protests to challenge discrimination against sexuality. Some activists began celebrating homosexuality, but the movement did not really take off until the Stonewall riots of 1969.

Changes in social norms 
In America, a dramatic shift in traditional ideas about sex and sexuality arose from a number of social changes. In 1969, Blue Movie, directed by Andy Warhol, premiered. Films as early as the 1880s contained sexual images and some pornographic content was filmed in the 1920s, but Blue Movie was the first erotic film to gain wide theatrical release.    This film helped to introduce “porno chic” and the Golden Age of Porn (1969-1984). Pornography became a publicly discussed topic that was taken seriously by critics.

Magazines depicting erotic and nude content increased in circulation at this time as well. After Playboy’s founding in 1953, the magazine was selling 1.1 million copies by 1960.  By 1970, it was circulating 5.4 million copies worldwide, and it peaked in circulation in 1972 with 7.16 million copies and “a quarter of all American male college students reportedly reading it in the 1970s.”  The first Playboy Club opened in Chicago in 1960, and members were served food and drink by Playboy Bunnies. Clubs were later opened in 23 other U.S. cities.  Writer and prominent feminist of the time, Gloria Steinem, went undercover at a Playboy Club in 1963 and found that women were often mistreated and exploited.

In the 1960s, bans on erotic novels were challenged, and the standard of what should be banned was changed. In Grove Press, Inc. v. Gerstein (1964), the Grove Press published Henry Miller’s novel Tropic of Cancer, which was banned in the United States. The U.S. Supreme Court rejected the ban on the novel in a 5-4 vote because it was decided it had literary merit and was not “utterly without redeeming social value.”  In a similar case, Memoirs v. Massachusetts (1966), the Massachusetts Supreme Judicial Court decided that John Cleland’s The Life and Adventures of Miss Fanny Hill was obscene. The U.S. Supreme Court overturned that ruling in a 6-3 vote and stated that this book was also not “utterly without redeeming social value.”  This ruling made banning books with sexual content more difficult because any books with literary merit or social importance could no longer be considered obscene in the United States.

Despite the changing social norms, it is unclear if rates of sex increased in revolutionary proportions during the 1960s. Daniel Scott Smith studied sex rates and saw increases in certain groups between 1940 and 1967. As John Levi Martin explains, “[Scott] concludes that members of the upper classes, whom the female-college-student surveys tend to study, change later than the rest of the population, and it is when they finally rejoin their lower-class counterparts in sexual mores and behavior that we suddenly believe a sexual revolution is upon us. This argument is supported by historical work that suggests that premarital sex – and not simply sex with a fiancé – was by no means uncommon among urban working-class women before the 1920s.”

In addition, Phillips Cutright examined data about the age of first menses in the Western population and illegitimacy levels from 1940 to 1968, and he found that no changes of revolutionary proportions occurred. The only “substantial increases” were among young whites with their future husbands. He determined that the age of the first menses in women decreased from 1940 to 1968 likely due to better nutrition, which suggests that earlier “low illegitimacy rates among young girls were due to biological factors as well as to the social controls depressing sexual activity.” He suggests that “the myth of an abstinent past and promiscuous present is highly exaggerated.”

The Pill 
Beginning in 1960, “The Pill” provided many women with an affordable way to avoid pregnancy. Before the pill was introduced many women did not look for long-term jobs because they would need to leave the job market when they became pregnant. Abortion was illegal and presented many health risks if performed. After birth control, a higher percentage of women graduated from school and college, which allowed them to later gain professional careers.

With the invention of the pill, women could safely control their sexuality and fertility. Previous methods of birth control existed, including herbal remedies and early condoms, which were less protective and not legalized.  Birth control “was female-controlled, simple to use, highly effective, and most revolutionary of all, it separated reproduction and contraception from the sexual act.” While critics claimed that the pill would lead to immorality, it allowed women to gain some freedoms in making choices about their bodies. 
 
The pill was originally endorsed by the government as a form of population control to counter overpopulation. President Lyndon Johnson’s social reform policy, The Great Society, aimed to eliminate poverty and racial injustice.  By 1960, the Food and Drug Administration had licensed the drug. 'The Pill', as it came to be known, was extraordinarily popular, and despite worries over possible side effects, by 1962, an estimated 1,187,000 women were using it. Despite its popularity with women, the pill was still a controversial subject. In 1964, it was illegal in eight states, including Connecticut and New York.
 
The pill was easier to obtain for married women, especially after Griswold v. Connecticut (1965). The U.S. Supreme Court sided with Estelle Griswold, the executive director of the Planned Parenthood League of Connecticut, and stated that the right to privacy for married couples was granted in the U.S. Constitution.  While this ruling made it easier for married women to obtain birth control, unmarried women who requested gynecological exams and oral contraceptives were often denied or lectured on sexual morality. Those women who were denied access to the pill often had to visit several doctors before one would prescribe it to them.  In 1972, the Supreme Court extended these rights to unmarried couples in Eisenstadt v. Baird.

Criticisms of the Pill 
Criticisms of the pill developed among certain groups, Black populations in particular. The origin of the pill as a form of population control for those living in poverty created distrust among groups that were systematically impoverished. Robert Chrisman argued that birth control could now be used as genocide with racist motives, saying “contraception, abortion, sterilization are now major weapons in the arsenal of the U.S.’ Agency for International Development.”  Attendees at the Black Power Conference in Newark, New Jersey also argued against birth control and feared it was a tool to limit Black power.

These fears about the pill continued to develop through the decade, and even into the 1970s. The United States, especially the South, had a history of controlling Black fertility, first under slavery and later through sterilization. In Dick Gregory’s cover story for the October 1971 edition of Ebony magazine, he wrote, “back in the days of slavery, Black folks couldn't grow kids fast enough for white folks to harvest. Now that we've got a little taste of power, white folks want to call a moratorium on having children." Still, a number of Black women chose to take the pill because they desired control over their fertility.

In 1969, journalist Barbara Seaman published The Doctors’ Case Against the Pill, which outlined a number of side effects. She provided evidence for “the risk of blood clots, heart attack, stroke, depression, weight gain, and loss of libido.” Her book would lead to congressional hearings about the safety of the pill in the 1970s.

The Women's Movement 
Second-wave feminism developed in the 1960s and 1970s, demanding equal opportunities and rights for women. The feminist and women's liberation movements helped change ideas about women and their sexuality. In The Feminine Mystique, Betty Friedan discussed the domestic role of women in 1960s America and the feeling of dissatisfaction with that role. Friedan suggested that women should not conform to this popularized view of the feminine as “The Housewife” and that they should participate in and enjoy the act of sex.

The women's liberation movement also criticized the beauty standards of sexuality in the 1960s. The New York Radical Women, a radical civil rights, New Left, and antiwar group, protested against the Miss America beauty pageant in Atlantic City, New Jersey. These women threw their bras, copies of Playboy, high heels, and other objects of beauty into a “Freedom Trash Can.”  Later feminists argued that sexual liberation allowed the patriarchy to hypersexualize women and gave men “free access” to women.

However, despite second-wave feminists sometimes being considered “anti-sex,” many women were interested in liberating women from certain sexual constraints. The women's liberation movement prioritized “its cultural challenge not to unjust laws but to the very definitions of female and male, the entire system then called ‘sex roles’ by sociologists.”

Gay Rights and the "undocumented" sexual revolution 
Homosexuality was still considered a developmental maladjustment by medical establishments throughout the 1950s and 1960s. Prejudices against homosexual behavior were cloaked in the language of medical authority, and homosexuals were unable to argue for the same legal and social rights.
  
Homosexuals were sometimes characterized as dangerous and predatory deviants. For example, the Florida Legislative Investigation Committee, between 1956 and 1965, sought out these 'deviants' within the public system, with a particular focus upon teachers. The persecution of gay teachers was driven by the popular belief that homosexuals could prey on vulnerable young people and recruit them into homosexuality. In addition, male homosexuals were often seen as inherently more dangerous (particularly to children) than lesbians, due to stereotypes and societal prejudices.

In addition, most states had sodomy laws, which made anal sex a crime. It was punishable by up to 10 years in prison.  However, by 1971, the first gay pornographic feature film, Boys in the Sand, was shown at the 55th Street Playhouse in New York City. With this movie, the gay community was launched into the sexual revolution and the porn industry.  Earlier homoerotic films existed, especially in Europe, as early as 1908. These films were underground and sold in discreet channels.

The gay rights movement was less popular in the 1960s than later decades, but it still engaged in public protest and an attitude “celebratory about the homosexual lifestyle.” The Mattachine Societies in Washington, D.C. and New York staged demonstrations that protested discrimination against homosexuals. These groups argued “that the closing of gay bars was a denial of the right to free assembly and that the criminalization of homosexuality was a denial of the ‘right to the pursuit of happiness.’” In 1969, the United States had fifty gay and lesbian organizations that engaged in public protest.

These gay rights groups also challenged traditional gender roles, similar to feminist movements of the time. The Mattachine leaders emphasized that homosexual oppression required strict definitions of gender behavior. Social roles equated “male, masculine, man only with husband and father” and equated “female, feminine, women only with wife and mother.” These activists saw homosexual women and men as victims of a “language and culture that did not admit the existence of a homosexual minority.” The homophile movement and gay rights activist fought for an expansion of rights based on similar theories that drove some heterosexual women to reject traditional sexual norms.

The Stonewall riots, 1969 
In the early morning of June 28, 1969, police raided the Stonewall Inn, the most popular gay bar in New York City, located in the city's Greenwich Village neighborhood. The police asked for identification from patrons of the bar; asked to verify the sex of cross-dressers, drag queens and trans people; and assaulted lesbian women when frisking them. As they took people out of the club, a scuffle began between a woman and police officers, and it quickly dissolved into a riot. Protests continued into the next day. The Stonewall riots are considered a defining moment in the gay rights movement and have become a “‘year zero’ in public consciousness and historical memory.”
  
The Stonewall riots of 1969 marked an increase in public awareness of gay rights campaigns, and it increased the willingness of homosexuals across America to join groups and campaign for rights. However, it would be misleading to conclude that resistance to homosexual oppression began or ended with Stonewall. David Allyn argues that numerous acts of small-scale resistance are necessary for large political movements, and the years preceding Stonewall played a role in creating the gay liberation movement. 
 
The Stonewall riots are a pivotal moment in gay rights history because they enabled many members of the gay community to identify with the struggle for gay rights.  Gay life after Stonewall was just as varied and complex as it was before. Still, the development of the Gay Liberation Front in 1969 sought “to create new ‘social form and relations’ that would be based on ‘brotherhood, cooperation, human love, and uninhibited sexuality.”

See also 

 Birth control movement in the United States
 Blue Movie
 55th Street Playhouse
 Helen Singer Kaplan
 Masters and Johnson
 Make Love, Not War: The Sexual Revolution: An Unfettered History, 2001 book
 New Andy Warhol Garrick Theatre
 Reproductive rights
 Sex in the American Civil War
 Timeline of reproductive rights legislation

References 

Sexual revolution
Sexuality in the United States
Counterculture of the 1960s